Lianping Prisonis a prison in Guangdong province, China, situated in Zhongxin town, Lianping County. It was established as Huiyang Region Liantang Laogai Farm in 1972. It is a large-scale prison where prisoners work in the nearby Lianping Prison Tea Manufacturing Plant.

References

See also  

 Foshan Prison
 Panyu Prison
 Jiangmen Prison
 Gaoming Prison
 Jiaoling Prison

Prisons in Guangdong
1971 establishments in China
Lianping County